Fully Automated Luxury Communism: A Manifesto is a book by Aaron Bastani first published by Verso Books in 2019. It argues that technology can be used to create a post-scarcity economy of widespread prosperity.

Synopsis
The book argues that human history can be divided into three broad periods, each characterized by substantial changes in technology: prehistory to the dawn of agriculture; agriculture to the Industrial Revolution; and the present period, characterised by the explosive spread of information technology. 

Bastani suggests that the prosperity ushered in by technology is inconsistent with contemporary models of capitalism. While capitalism is organised around a logic of scarcity, the technologically-mediated prosperity he predicts is characterised by the absence of scarcity.

Critical reception
British journalist Andy Beckett wrote that Bastani "bases his predictions on a broad-brush reading of history", commenting that "[s]ome readers will finish this book exhilarated and energised. Others will be unconvinced, or utterly baffled."

Ville Kellokumpu argues that the work fails to account sufficiently for the impact of climate change and the dependence of contemporary industry on fossil fuels. Jason Barker agrees, commenting that ecological destruction appears to be the consistent result of past technological transitions and that, in this respect, it is likely that the future will resemble the past.

References 

2019 non-fiction books
Books about capitalism
Books about communism
Economics books
Verso Books books
Books about automation